The Battle of Porto Praya was a naval battle that took place during the American Revolutionary War on 16 April 1781 between a British squadron under Commodore George Johnstone and a French squadron under the Bailli de Suffren.

Both squadrons were en route to the Cape of Good Hope, the British to take it from the Dutch, the French aiming to help defend it and French possessions in the Indian Ocean. The British convoy and its escorting squadron had anchored at Porto Praya (now Praia) in the Portuguese Cape Verde Islands to take on water, when the French squadron arrived and attacked them at anchor.

Due to the unexpected nature of the encounter, neither fleet was prepared to do battle, and in the inconclusive battle the French fleet sustained more damage than the British, though no ships were lost. Johnstone tried to pursue the French, but was forced to call it off in order to repair the damage his ships had taken.

The French gained a strategic victory, because Suffren beat Johnstone to the Cape and reinforced the Dutch garrison before continuing on his journey to the Île de France (now Mauritius).

Background
France had entered the American Revolutionary War in 1778, and Britain declared war on the Dutch Republic in late 1780, when the Dutch refused to stop trading with the French and the Americans. Johnstone was ordered to lead an expedition to capture the Dutch colony at the Cape of Good Hope.

On 13 March 1781 Johnstone sailed from Spithead with a fleet of 37 ships, including five ships of the line, three frigates, and a large number of troop convoy ships.  In early April the fleet anchored in the neutral harbour of Porto Praya in the Portuguese-controlled Cape Verde Islands to take on water and supplies.

Suffren had been dispatched on a mission to provide military assistance to French and Dutch colonies in India, leading a fleet of five ships of the line, seven transports, and a corvette to escort the transports. On 22 March he had sailed in the company of a fleet destined for North America under Admiral de Grasse, with word of Johnstone's mission and an objective to reach the Cape first.

One of Suffren's ships, Artésien, had originally been destined for America, and was in need of water, so the French fleet paused when it approached Santiago on 16 April, and Suffren ordered the Artésien to the harbour.

Battle

When the Artésien reached the mouth of the harbour, she spotted the British fleet at anchor, and signalled Suffren that the enemy was in sight. Suffren, assuming (correctly) that the fleet had men ashore and would be in some disarray, immediately gave orders to attack, leading the way with his flagship, the Héros. Johnstone, who was in the process of ordering ship manoeuvres to separate ships that had drifted too close to one another when the French squadron was spotted, had to scramble to prepare the fleet for battle.

Suffren's orders were for his line to anchor before the British fleet and open fire. Annibal soon came to his aid, and eventually drew most of the fire. Artésien, whose captain was killed early in the engagement, captured the East Indiaman  in the confusion, and then a breeze blew her away from the action. The Vengeur passed along the anchored British fleet exchanging broadsides but never anchored herself and passed out of the action, while the Sphinx also failed to anchor, and only contributed minimally to the action.

Suffren, with the advantage of surprise, maintained the action with the two anchored ships for ninety minutes until damage (Annibal lost two of three masts) led him to signal a retreat while maintaining fire. Annibal lost her third mast on her way out of the harbour, and was slow to follow Héros.

The French captured the East Indiamen Hinchinbrook and Fortitude, and the victualer Edward. The British recaptured Fortitude the next day.

Aftermath
Suffren gathered his fleet together outside the harbour to assess damage and make repairs. Terror and Infernal had got out to sea and the French fired on them. Despite being set on fire, Terror escaped and her crew extinguished the flames. The French captured Infernal, and took out Captain Henry Darby and some sailors and soldiers.

Johnstone got his squadron ready and came out of the harbour in pursuit about three hours later. Suffren adopted an aggressive line, and Johnstone, some of whose ships — especially  — had suffered significant damage, chose not to renew the battle, and returned to the harbour to effect repairs. However, before he returned, he succeeded in recovering Infernal. Her remaining crew had recaptured her while the prize crew were off their guard. Alternatively, her prize crew abandoned her at the approach of the British squadron. Their prize crews also abandoned  and Edward, and the British recovered the vessels a few days later.

Suffren's squadron reached the Cape of Good Hope on 21 June, with the troop convoys arriving nine days later. After spending a month there for repair and refit, he left 500 men for the defence of the Dutch colony and proceeded on to Ile de France. Johnstone, however, still headed for the Cape and arrived in July and at Saldanha Bay took five Dutch East Indies vessels as prizes. He then made his way back to England.

Order of battle 

Three frigates, the corvette Fortune, and numerous transports did not engage.

Armed transports
 Lord Townsend
 Manilla
 Porpoise

East Indiamen
 
 
 
  (Captain Grigory) 
 Hastings
 Hinchinbrook
 Latham
 
 Lord North
 
 
 Southampton

Legacy 
The Agosta-class submarine La Praya (S 622) was named in honour of the battle.

Sources and references 
 Notes

References

 Bibliography
 
 
 Demerliac, Alain (1996) La Marine De Louis XVI: Nomenclature Des Navires Français De 1774 À 1792. (Nice: Éditions OMEGA). 
 
 
 Theal, George McCall (1897) History of South Africa under the administration of the Dutch East India Company, 1652 to 1795. (S. Sonnenschein & co., Ptd.).
  Final French Struggles in India and on the Indian Seas

Porto Praya
Porto Praya
Porto Praya
Porto Praya
1781 in Africa
History of Santiago, Cape Verde
18th century in Cape Verde